Rubina Feroze Bhatti (born 1969) is a Pakistani human rights activist, peace activist and leadership consultant. She is currently a member on the country's National Commission on the Rights of Child where she represents Punjab province.

Early life and education 
Rubina Bhatti, one of four children, was born and raised in Sargodha, where she completed her Matric and Intermediate. She did her Bachelor of Science in 1990 from the University of the Punjab, and earned her Master’s Degree in Chemistry from Bahauddin Zakariya University (BZU) in 1993. Later, she did a Master’s in Development Studies at Maynooth University, Ireland in 2008 where she was honored with the Student of the Year Award. Finally, she earned a PhD in Leadership Studies at the University of San Diego, California, USA in 2015.

Career 
Bhatti started a job as a Lecturer of Chemistry at Government College for Women, Sargodha where she taught from February 1996 to December 2004. In 1998, she and a team of her students formed an informal group called Taangh Wasaib (Urdu words' meaning “longing for the fullness of humanity"). After teaching in a public education sector and completing Masters in Development Studies, she entered the social development sector, and formally joined Taangh Wasaib Organization which works for the promotion of communal harmony, gender equality, and respect for human rights. She served there in different capacities including General Secretary and as the Executive Director until March 2020. She used Sufism as a tool for building peace among diverse communities in Pakistan, and promoted the Sufis' message based on the ideals of brotherhood and harmony. She developed a Peace Garden, a place that served for both reflection and celebration, of stillness and revelry, poetry and music. She has been involved in providing her services to train community leaders, activists, and journalists on leadership development, peace-building, and human rights advocacy. She has served as a member of governing body at the Centre for Social Justice and Peoples Commission for Minorities Rights.

Bhatti has served as Visiting scholar at Eastern Mennonite University in 2011, and as Project Lead, Women's Leadership Dialogue for Change at University of San Diego, 2013-2014. She has given talks and lectures at national and international forums on empowerment of women, violence against women, women in peacebuilding, women in leadership, and human rights. She served as a member of an Advisory Council for Minorities Affairs to Chief Minister of Punjab during 2015 and 2018.

Bhatti was selected to serve as the Member Punjab at the National Commission for Rights of Child, a statutory body established in April 2020 by the Government of Pakistan under NCRC Act, 2017 and is mandated to examine and review existing and proposed laws, policies, practice and proposals in the best interest of the children, and carry out an inquiry in cases involving a violation of child rights. As a member of NCRC, she is engaged in policy dialogue and monitoring situation to legally protect, and effectively implement the child rights in conformity with national and international instruments dealing with promotion and protection of children's rights.

Publications 
What is Leadership
 The Vision of Peace
Productive volunteerism
 Women's Rights
Human Rights Education

Articles 
Bhatti, Rubina Feroze (2021-12-11). "Child Rights In Pakistan: Reframing Policy And Practice". Naya Daur. Retrieved 2021-09-01

Awards and recognition 
Woman of Courage Award 2011, from the National Women's Political Caucus
 2015 N-Peace Awards by the United Nations Development Program (UNDP) 
Woman PeaceMaker at the Joan B. Kroc Institute for Peace & Justice in 2009.
World Vision International Peacemaking Award in 2010 
 Human Rights Awards by Ministry for Human Rights & Minorities Affairs, Government of Punjab during the PML-N and PTI governments
Among the 1,000 Women nominated for the Nobel Peace Prize 2005.
Nominated among the 100 women who matter most in Pakistan
 Named among the female achievers of the year 2015 on The News International list of 2015's Movers and Shakers in Pakistan.
One of the world’s 200 Women in Development chosen by European Union in 2016
 International Visitor Leadership Program (IVLP) to study the culture of community service and volunteerism in the USA. She was honored as a Member of the Month at the International Exchange Alumni website in June 2015.

References 

Living people
1969 births
Pakistani women
Punjabi women
People from Sargodha
Pakistani human rights activists
Pakistani humanists
Pakistani feminists
Pakistani children's rights activists
Minority rights activists
Children's rights activists
Pakistani women's rights activists
Pakistani civil rights activists
Pacifists
Nonviolence advocates
Bahauddin Zakariya University alumni
University of San Diego alumni
Pakistani Christians
Pakistani Christian pacifists